Slavery in Canada includes historical practices of enslavement practiced by both the First Nations during the pre-Columbian era, and by colonists during the period of European colonization.

Britain banned the institution of slavery in present-day Canada (and British colonies) in 1833, though the practice of slavery in Canada had effectively ended already early in the 19th century through local statutes and court decisions resulting from litigation on behalf of enslaved people seeking manumission.  The courts, to varying degrees, rendered slavery unenforceable in both Lower Canada and Nova Scotia. In Lower Canada, for example, after court decisions in the late 1790s, the "slave could not be compelled to serve longer than he would, and ... might leave his master at will." Upper Canada passed the Act Against Slavery in 1793,  one of the earliest anti-slavery acts in the world.

As slavery in the United States continued until 1865 with the passage of the Thirteenth Amendment, black people (free and enslaved) began immigrating to Canada from the United States after the American Revolution and again after the War of 1812, many by way of the Underground Railroad.

Because Canada's role in the Atlantic slave trade was comparatively limited, the history of Black slavery in Canada is often overshadowed by the more tumultuous slavery practised elsewhere in the Americas.

Under Indigenous rule
Slave-owning people of what became Canada were, for example, the fishing societies such as the Yurok, that lived along the Pacific coast from Alaska to California, on what is sometimes described as the Pacific or Northern Northwest Coast., Some of the indigenous peoples of the Pacific Northwest Coast, such as the Haida and Tlingit, were traditionally known as fierce warriors and slave-traders, raiding as far as California. Slavery was hereditary, the slaves being prisoners of war and their descendants were slaves. Some nations in British Columbia continued to segregate and ostracize the descendants of slaves as late as the 1970s. Among a few Pacific Northwest nations about a quarter of the population were slaves.

One slave narrative was composed by an Englishman, John R. Jewitt. He had been taken alive when his ship was captured in 1802 by the Nuu-chah-nulth people due to the ship's captain having insulted their chief, Maquinna, and other slights inflicted against their people by other American and European captains. Jewitt's memoir provides a detailed look at life as a slave.

Under European colonization
The historian Marcel Trudel estimates that there were fewer than 4,200 slaves in the area of Canada (New France) and later the Canadas between 1671 and 1831. Around two-thirds of these slaves were of indigenous ancestry 
(2,700 typically called panis, from the French term for Pawnee) and one third were of African descent (1,443). They were house servants and farm workers.  The number of Black slaves increased during British rule, especially with the arrival of United Empire Loyalists after 1783. The Maritimes  saw 1,200 to 2,000 slaves arrive prior to abolition, with 300 accounted for in Lower Canada, and between 500 and 700 in Upper Canada. A small portion of Black Canadians today are descended from these slaves.

People of African descent were forcibly captured by local chiefs as chattel slaves and sold to traders bound for southern areas of the Americas. Those in what is now called Canada typically came from the American colonies, as no shiploads of human chattel went to Canada directly from Africa. There were no large plantations in Canada, and therefore no demand for a large slave work force of the sort that existed in most European colonies in the Americas. Nevertheless, slaves in Canada were subjected to the same physical, psychological, and sexual violence and punishments as their American counterparts.

Under French rule

Under French rule, enslaved First Nations people outnumbered enslaved individuals of African descent. According to Afua Cooper, author of "The Hanging of Angélique: The Untold Story of Canadian Slavery and the Burning of Old Montréal", this was due to the relative ease with which New France could acquire First Nations slaves. She noted that the mortality of slaves was high, with the average age of First Nations slaves only 17, and the average age of slaves of African descent, 25.  One of the first recorded Black slaves in Canada was brought by a British convoy to New France in 1628. Olivier le Jeune was the name given to the boy, originally from Madagascar.

By 1688, New France's population was 11,562 people, made up primarily of fur traders, missionaries, and farmers settled in the St. Lawrence Valley. To help overcome its severe shortage of servants and labourers, King Louis XIV granted New France's petition to import Black slaves from West Africa. Though no shipments ever arrived from Africa, colonists did acquire some Black slaves from other French and British colonies. From the late 1600s, they also acquired Indigenous slaves, mostly from what is now the U.S. Midwestern states, through their western fur-trade networks. Slaves of Indigenous origin were called "Panis," but few came from the Pawnee tribe.  More commonly, they were of Fox, Dakota, Iowa, and Apache origin, captives taken in war by Indigenous allies and trading partners of the French.

While slavery was prohibited in France, it was permitted in its colonies as a means of providing the massive labour force needed to clear land, construct buildings and (in the Caribbean colonies) work on sugar, indigo and tobacco plantations. The 1685 Code Noir set the pattern for policing slavery in the West Indies. It required that all slaves be instructed as Catholics and not as Protestants. It concentrated on defining the condition of slavery, and established harsh controls. Slaves had virtually no rights, though the Code did enjoin masters to take care of the sick and old. The Code noir does not seem to have applied to Canada and so, in 1709, the intendant Jacques Raudot issued an ordinance officially recognizing slavery in New France; slavery existed before that date, but only as of 1709 was it instituted in law.

One slave is well-recorded in the history of Montreal: Marie-Joseph Angélique was held in slavery by a rich widow in that city. In 1734, after learning that she was going to be sold and separated from her lover, Angélique set fire to her owner's house and escaped. The fire raged out of control, destroying forty-six buildings. Captured two months later, Angélique was paraded through the city, then tortured until she confessed her crime. In the afternoon of the day of execution, Angélique was taken through the streets of Montreal and, after the stop at the church for her amende honorable, made to climb a scaffold facing the ruins of the buildings destroyed by the fire. There she was hanged until dead, with her body flung into the fire and the ashes scattered in the wind.

Historian Marcel Trudel recorded approximately 4,000 slaves by the end of New France in 1759, of which 2,472 were Aboriginal people, and 1,132 Blacks. After the Conquest of New France by the British, slave ownership remained dominated by the French. Trudel identified 1,509 slave owners, of which only 181 were English. Trudel also noted 31 marriages took place between French colonists and Aboriginal slaves.

Under British rule

First Nations owned or traded in slaves, an institution that had existed for centuries or longer among certain groups. Shawnee, Potawatomi, and other western tribes imported slaves from Ohio and Kentucky and sold or gifted them to allies and Canadian settlers. Mohawk Chief Thayendenaga (Joseph Brant) used black people he had captured during the American Revolution to build Brant House at Burlington Beach and a second home near Brantford. In all, Brant owned about forty black slaves.

Black slaves lived in the British regions of Canada in the 18th century—104 were listed in a 1767 census of Nova Scotia, but their numbers were small until the United Empire Loyalist influx after 1783. As white Loyalists fled the new American Republic, they took with them about 2,000 black slaves: 1,200 to the Maritimes (Nova Scotia, New Brunswick, and Prince Edward Island), 300 to Lower Canada (Quebec), and 500 to Upper Canada (Ontario). In Ontario, the Imperial Act of 1790 assured prospective immigrants that their slaves would remain their property. As under French rule, Loyalist slaves were held in small numbers and were employed as domestic servants, farm hands, and skilled artisans.

Following the Battle of the Plains of Abraham and the British conquest of New France, the subject of slavery in Canada is unmentioned—neither banned nor permitted—in both the Treaty of Paris of 1763 and the Quebec Act of 1774 or the Treaty of Paris of 1783.

The system of gang labour, and its consequent institutions of control and brutality, did not develop in Canada as it did in the USA. Because they did not appear to pose a threat to their masters, slaves were permitted to learn to read and write, Christian conversion was encouraged, and their marriages were recognized by law.  Death rates among slaves were nevertheless high, confirming the brutal nature of the slave regime.

The Quebec Gazette of 12 July 1787 had an advertisement:

Abolition movement

Lower Canada (Quebec)
In Lower Canada, Sir James Monk, the Chief Justice, rendered a series of decisions in the late 1790s that undermined the ability to compel slaves to serve their masters; while "not technically abolishing slavery, [they] rendered it innocuous." As a result, slaves began to flee their masters within the province, but also from other provinces and from the United States. This occurred several years before the legislature acted in Upper Canada to limit slavery. While the decision was founded upon a technicality (the extant law allowing committal of slaves not to jails, but only to houses of correction, of which there were none in the province), Monk went on to say that "slavery did not exist in the province and to warn owners that he would apply this interpretation of the law to all subsequent cases." In subsequent decisions, and in the absence of specific legislation, Monk's interpretation held (even once there had been houses of correction established). In a later test of this interpretation, the administrator of Lower Canada, Sir James Kempt, refused in 1829 a request from the U.S. government to return an escaped slave, informing that fugitives might be given up only when the crime in question was also a crime in Lower Canada: "The state of slavery is not recognized by the Law of Canada. ... Every Slave therefore who comes into the Province is immediately free whether he has been brought in by violence or has entered it of his own accord."

Nova Scotia

While many black people who arrived in Nova Scotia during the American Revolution were free, others were not. Some blacks arrived in Nova Scotia as the property of white American Loyalists. In 1772, prior to the American Revolution, Britain outlawed the slave trade in the British Isles followed by the Knight v. Wedderburn decision in Scotland in 1778. This decision, in turn, influenced the colony of Nova Scotia. In 1788, abolitionist James Drummond MacGregor from Pictou published the first anti-slavery literature in Canada and began purchasing slaves' freedom and chastising his colleagues in the Presbyterian church who owned slaves. Historian Alan Wilson describes the document as "a landmark on the road to personal freedom in province and country". Historian Robin Winks writes it is "the sharpest attack to come from a Canadian pen even into the 1840s; he had also brought about a public debate which soon reached the courts". (Abolitionist lawyer Benjamin Kent was buried in Halifax in 1788.) In 1790 John Burbidge freed his slaves. Led by Richard John Uniacke, in 1787, 1789 and again on 11 January 1808 the Nova Scotian legislature refused to legalize slavery. Two chief justices, Thomas Andrew Lumisden Strange (1790–1796) and Sampson Salter Blowers (1797–1832), were instrumental in freeing slaves from their owners in Nova Scotia. They were held in high regard in the colony. Justice Alexander Croke (1801–1815) also impounded American slave ships during this time period (the most famous being the Liverpool Packet). During the war, Nova Scotian Sir William Winniett served as a crew on board HMS Tonnant in the effort to free slaves from America. (As the Governor of the Gold Coast, Winniett would later also work to end the slave trade in Western Africa.) By the end of the War of 1812 and the arrival of the Black Refugees, there were few slaves left in Nova Scotia. (The Slave Trade Act outlawed the slave trade in the British Empire in 1807 and the Slavery Abolition Act of 1833 outlawed slavery altogether.)

The Sierra Leone Company was established to relocate groups of formerly enslaved Africans, nearly 1,200 black Nova Scotians, most of whom had escaped enslavement in the United States. Given the coastal environment of Nova Scotia, many had died from the harsh winters. They created a settlement in the existing colony in Sierra Leone (already established to make a home for the "poor blacks" of London) at Freetown in 1792. Many of the "black poor" included other African and Asian inhabitants of London. The Freetown settlement was joined, particularly after 1834, by other groups of freed Africans and became the first African American haven in Africa for formerly enslaved Africans.

Upper Canada (Ontario)

By 1790, the abolition movement was gaining credence in Canada and the ill intent of slavery was evidenced by an incident involving a slave woman being violently abused by her slave owner on her way to being sold in the United States. In 1793, Chloe Cooley, in an act of defiance yelled out screams of resistance. The abuse committed by her slave owner and her violent resistance was witnessed by Peter Martin and William Grisely. Peter Martin, a former slave, brought the incident to the attention of Lieutenant Governor John Graves Simcoe. Under the auspices of Simcoe, the Act Against Slavery of 1793 was legislated. The elected members of the executive council, many of whom were merchants or farmers who depended on slave labour, saw no need for emancipation. Attorney-General John White later wrote that there was "much opposition but little argument" to his measure. Finally the Assembly passed the Act Against Slavery that legislated the gradual abolition of slavery: no slaves could be imported; slaves already in the province would remain enslaved until death, no new slaves could be brought into Upper Canada, and children born to female slaves would be slaves but must be freed at age 25. To discourage manumission, the Act required the master to provide security that the former slave would not become a public charge. The compromise Act Against Slavery stands as the only attempt by any Ontario legislature to act against slavery. This legal rule ensured the eventual end of slavery in Upper Canada, although as it diminished the sale value of slaves within the province it also resulted in slaves being sold to the United States. In 1798 there was an attempt by lobby groups to rectify the legislation and import more slaves. Slaves discovered they could gain freedom by escaping to Ohio and Michigan in the United States.

By 1800, the other provinces of British North America had effectively limited slavery through court decisions requiring the strictest proof of ownership, which was rarely available. In 1819, John Robinson, Attorney General of Upper Canada, declared that by residing in Canada, black residents were set free, and that Canadian courts would protect their freedom.
Slavery remained legal, however, until the British Parliament's Slavery Abolition Act finally abolished slavery in most parts of the British Empire effective 1 August 1834.

Underground Railroad

During the early to mid-19th century, the Underground Railroad network was established in the United States to free slaves, by bringing them to locations where the slaves would be free from being re-captured.  British North America, now known as Canada, was a major destination of the Underground Railroad. The Canadian public's awareness of slavery in Canada is typically limited to the Underground Railroad, which is the only education relating to the history of slavery that school children typically receive.

In Nova Scotia, former slave Richard Preston established the African Abolition Society in the fight to end slavery in America. Preston was trained as a minister in England and met many of the leading voices in the abolitionist movement that helped to get the Slavery Abolition Act passed by the British Parliament in 1833. When Preston returned to Nova Scotia, he became the president of the Abolitionist movement in Halifax.
Preston stated:

There are slave cemeteries in parts of Canada, in various states of condition, some neglected and abandoned. They include cemeteries in St-Armand, Quebec; Shelburne, Nova Scotia; and Priceville and Dresden in Ontario.

Modern slavery

The ratifying of the Slavery Convention by Canada in 1953 began the country's international commitments to address modern slavery. Human trafficking in Canada is a legal and political issue, and Canadian legislators have been criticized for having failed to deal with the problem in a more systematic way. British Columbia's Office to Combat Trafficking in Persons formed in 2007, making British Columbia the first province of Canada to address human trafficking in a formal manner. The biggest human trafficking case in Canadian history surrounded the dismantling of the Domotor-Kolompar criminal organization. On June 6, 2012, the Government of Canada established the National Action Plan to Combat Human Trafficking in order to oppose human trafficking. The Human Trafficking Taskforce was established in June 2012 to replace the Interdepartmental Working Group on Trafficking in Persons as the body responsible for the development of public policy related to human trafficking in Canada.

One current and highly publicized instance is the vast disappearances of Aboriginal women which has been linked to human trafficking by some sources. Former Prime Minister Stephen Harper had been reluctant to tackle the issue on the grounds that it is not a "sociological issue" and declined to create a national inquiry into the issue counter to United Nations and Inter-American Commission on Human Rights' opinions that the issue is significant and in need of higher inquiry.

See also
 Marie-Joseph Angélique
 Marguerite Duplessis
 History of slavery
 Human rights in Canada
 History of slavery in Louisiana
 Turner Chapel, Oakville's Black church
 R v Jones (New Brunswick)

References

Further reading

 
 
 Clarke, George Elliott."'This Is No Hearsay': Reading the Canadian Slave Narratives," Papers of the Bibliographical Society of Canada / Cahiers De La Société Bibliographique du Canada 2005 43(1): 7–32, original narratives written by Canadian slaves
 
 
  . Winner, 2007 Governor General's Literary Award for Nonfiction; Nominee (Nonfiction), National Books Critics Circle Award 2007. See, Governor General's Award for English language non-fiction.
 Hajda, Yvonne P. "Slavery in the Greater Lower Columbia Region,"  Ethnohistory 2005 52(3): 563–588,
 Henry, Natasha, Emancipation Day: Celebrating Freedom in Canada
  in JSTOR
 
 
 Whitfield, Harvey. "Black Loyalists and Black Slaves in Maritime Canada," History Compass 2007 5(6): 1980-1997,

 Nova Scotia Historical Society

External links
 Black Canada and the Journey to Freedom
 Runaway Slave advertisement 1772, Nova Scotia
 Slavery in Canada, (C) 1899, AcrossCan.com
 History of Slavery in Canada Portal

 
Economic history of Canada
Legal history of Canada
History of Black people in Canada
History of human rights in Canada
Slavery in the British Empire